Ossama Hussein Haidar (born 14 January 1980) is a Lebanese former footballer who played as a forward.

Club career 
Haidar started his career at Tadamon Sour in 1999, before moving to Ahed in 2004. In 2010, Haidar moved to Salam Sour, before ending his career at Tadamon Sour in the 2015–16 Lebanese Second Division.

International career 
Haidar played for the Lebanon national team between 2002 and 2004, making 12 appearances.

Honours 
Individual
 Lebanese Premier League Team of the Season: 2006–07

References

External links 
 
 

1980 births
Living people
People from Tyre District
Lebanese footballers
Association football forwards
Lebanon youth international footballers
Lebanon international footballers
Lebanese Premier League players
Tadamon Sour SC players
Al Ahed FC players
Footballers at the 2002 Asian Games
Asian Games competitors for Lebanon